Béla Bartók High School is a Hungarian-language high school in Timișoara.

History 
The building of the current high school was designed in 1932 by architect  as a confessional school of the Roman Catholic church in Iosefin. After the education reform of 1948, the building was expropriated, and a Hungarian-language county education center was established in the building, which was abolished in 1956. It was not until 1971 that it was reconstituted as a high school of mathematics and physics in Hungarian. In the 1980s the communists tried to eliminate the national specificity by introducing the Romanian classes. After 1990 it became a theoretical high school and was given the name Béla Bartók, after Sânnicolau Mare-born composer and pianist.

Students 
As of 2021–2022, the institution includes three kindergarten groups, 10 primary school classes, 8 middle school classes and 12 high school classes, totaling 626 students. The high school classes have four accredited specializations:
 mathematics and computer science (real profile);
 natural sciences (real profile);
 social sciences (humanist profile);
 technician in economic activities (service profile).

References 

Schools in Timișoara
Hungarian-language schools in Romania
High schools in Romania